Sarhang Muhsin Nader,(), (born 1 December 1986) is an Iraqi football goalkeeper of Kurdish ethnicity. He played for the Iraq national football team. and currently plays for Amanat Baghdad.

Honours
Iraqi Premier League:

 Champions (4): 2006–07, 2007–08, 2008–09 and 2011–12.
 Runner-up (3): 2010–11, 2012–13, 2013–14
 3rd (1): 2005–06.

Now days

Sarhang muhsin in 2022 
After winning 4 Iraqi premier league with Erbil , he’s currently playing for Amanat Baghdad.

External links

Association football goalkeepers
Iraqi footballers
Iraq international footballers
1986 births
Living people
People from Erbil
Erbil SC players
Kurdish sportspeople
Footballers at the 2006 Asian Games
Al-Shorta SC players
Asian Games competitors for Iraq

posts sarhang muhsin with erbil sport club
-iraqi premier league 2001-19 [دوري العراقي ممتاز]
-iraqi Elite Cup. [بطولة آم المعارك]
-iraqi Charity Cup. [بطولة البغداد الخيرية]
-iraqi Almahabba cup. [بطولة المحبة]
-AL-Shabab Jordan Cup 2006. [بطولة شباب الاردن]
-AL-Shabab Jordan Cup 2009. [بطولة شباب الاردن]
-arab club champions cup 2006-07. [كآس العرب لآندية الآبطال]
-AFC Champions League. [دوري ابطال اسيا]
-Thailand Kings Cup(iraqB). [كاس ملك تايلاند]
-iraq FA Cup. [كاس العراق]